Navasota is a genus of snout moths described by Émile Louis Ragonot in 1887.

Species
 Navasota chionophlebia Hampson, 1918
 Navasota discipunctella Hampson, 1918
 Navasota haemaphaeella Hampson, 1918
 Navasota hebetella Ragonot, 1887
 Navasota leuconeurella Hampson, 1918
 Navasota myriolecta Dyar, 1914
 Navasota persectella Hampson, 1918
 Navasota syriggia Hampson, 1918

References

Anerastiini
Pyralidae genera
Taxa named by Émile Louis Ragonot